Argyractis subornata is a moth in the family Crambidae. It is found in Brazil (São Paulo).

References

Acentropinae
Moths of South America
Moths described in 1897